Novobalakovo (Yañı Balaq) is a rural locality (a selo) in Chekmagushevsky District, Bashkortostan, Russia. The population was 104 as of 2010. There are 2 streets.

Geography 
Novobalakovo is located 32 km west of Chekmagush (the district's administrative centre) by road. Bulyakovo is the nearest rural locality.

References 

Rural localities in Chekmagushevsky District